Qasim, Qazeem or Qasem  is the  transliteration of the male given name, pronounced with a long first syllable. The meaning is one who distributes. The first known bearer of the name was the son of the Islamic prophet, Muhammad. 

There is an occasional variant spelling,, distinguished by a long second syllable. Both names can also be used as surnames.

In arts and entertainment

In literature
Gasim bey Zakir (1784-1857), Azerbaijani poet
Kacem El Ghazzali (born 24 June 1990), Moroccan-Swiss author and atheism activist 
Qasim Tawfiq, Jordanian novelist and short story writer
Qasem-e Anvar (1356-1433), Iranian Sufi poet
Mehdi Belhaj Kacem (born 1973), French-Tunisian actor, philosopher, and writer
Pirzada Qasim (born 1943), Pakistani scholar, Urdu poet, scientist and educator
Awn Alsharif Qasim (1933–2006), Sudanese writer

In music
Kasim Sulton (born 1955), American bass guitarist
 Kasseem Dean (born 1978), better known by his stage name, Swizz Beatz, American record producer

In other arts
Casey Kasem (1932–2014), American radio personality and voice actor
Jean Kasem (born 1954), American actress
Kasim Abid, Iraqi-British cameraman, film director and producer
KassemG or Kassem Gharaibeh, American comedian
Kerri Kasem (born 1978), American radio and television host
Mehrab Ghasem Khani (born 1970), Iranian film writer
Peyman Ghasem Khani (born 1966), Iranian film screenwriter and actor
Qasim Melho (born 1968), Syrian television and theatre actor

In government and politics
Al-Qasim ibn Harun al-Rashid was the third son of the Abbasid caliph Harun al-Rashid (r. 786–809), and for a time third-in-line (Heir presumptive) to the Abbasid Caliphate.
Abd al-Karim Qasim (1914–1963), Prime Minister of Iraq from July 1958 to February 1963
Abdullah Kassim Hanga (1932–1969), Zanzibar Prime Minister
Cassim Chilumpha (born 1958), Malawian politician
George A. Kasem (1919–2002), American congressional representative
Ghasem Sholeh-Saadi, Iranian politician
Ismail Qasim Naji, Somali politician
Kasım Gülek (1905–1996), Turkish statesman
Kasim Reed (born 1969), Democratic politician and the 59th Mayor of Atlanta
Kassim al-Rimawi (1918–1982), prime minister of Jordan in 1980
Kasym Khan (1445-1521), ruler of the Kazakh Khanate 
Kassym-Jomart Tokayev, Kazakh president.
Maryam Kassim, Somali politician
Qasim I of Astrakhan (ruled ca. 1470-1500), Khan of Astrakhan
Qasim II of Astrakhan (died 1532), Khan of Astrakhan
Qasim Khan (died 1469), first khan of the Qasim Khanate
Rafiq Belhaj Kacem, Tunisian politician
Syarif Kasim II, sultan of Siak Indrapura
Yahya Kassim Issa, Tanzanian politician

In military and combat
Kassem Daher, Lebanese-Canadian Islamic militant
Muhammad bin Qasim Al-Thaqafi (695–715), Umayyad general who conquered Sindh
Qassem Al-Nasser (1925–2007), Jordanian officer who participated in the 1948 Arab-Israeli War
Qassem Khan Vali (1878 – 1935), known as Sardar Homayoun, Iranian army general, trained in France
Qasem Soleimani (1957–2020), Iranian commander of the Quds Force
Tal'at Fu'ad Qasim (died 1995), Egyptian leader of militant Gama'a Islamiyya organization

In religion

Religious figures in early Islam
Qasim ibn Muhammad (died 605), son of Muhammad and Khadijah bint Khuwaylid
Qasim ibn Muhammad ibn Abi Bakr (died ca. 728), jurist in early Islam
Qasim ibn Hasan (ca. 666–680), son of Hasan ibn Ali and grandson of Muhammad

Modern religious figures
Isa Qassim (born 1937), Bahraini Ayatollah
Muhammad Qasim Nanotvi (1833-1880), Indian Islamic scholar and social activist
Qasem Taei (born 1960), Iraqi Twelver Shi'a Marja (grand ayatollah)

In sport

In football (soccer)
Ashraf Kasem (born 1966), Egyptian footballer
Dollah Kassim (1949–2010), Singaporean footballer
Ghasem Dehnavi (born 1981), Iranian footballer
Ghasem Haddadifar (born 1983), Iranian footballer
Kaseem Sinceno (born 1976), American football player
Kasım Yıldız (born 1980), Turkish footballer
Kassem El Zein (born 1990), Lebanese footballer
Kassim Guyazou (born 1982), Togolese footballer
Kassim Osgood (born 1980), American footballer
Mehdi Kacem (born 1986), Algerian footballer
Qasem Burhan (born 1985), Qatari footballer
Yaser Kasim (born 1991), Iraqi footballer

In other sports
Ghasem Rezaei (born 1985), Iranian wrestler
Iqbal Qasim (born 1953), Pakistani cricketer
Kassem Ibadulla (born 1964), New Zealand cricketer
Kassim Ouma (born 1978), Ugandan boxer
Kazeem Tajudeen (born 1998), Nigerian karateka

In other fields
 Qasim ibn Abdallah al-Manṣūr, was an Abbasid prince, youngest son of caliph al-Mansur (r. 754–775).
Qasim Amin (1863-1908), Egyptian jurist, early advocate of women's rights
Leyla Qasim (1952-1974), executed Iraqi Kurdish activist
Kassim Basma (born 1960), Sierra Leonean businessman
Peter Qasim (born 1974), Indian detained by Australian immigration
Yasin Qasem Muhammad Ismail (born ca. 1979), Yemeni held in Guantanamo
Kasem Chatikavanich, Thai business leader
Nazar Mohamed Kassim, Singaporean convicted murderer 
Syed Zahoor Qasim, Indian marine biologist

Arabic-language surnames
Arabic masculine given names
Bosniak masculine given names
Bosnian masculine given names
Turkish masculine given names